Antonio Spallino (1 April 1925 – 27 September 2017) was an Italian fencer. He won a gold, silver and bronze medal at two Olympic Games. Spallino was President of Panathlon International from 1988 to 1996. He was mayor of Como from 1970 to 1985.

References

External links
 
 
 

1925 births
2017 deaths
Italian male fencers
Olympic fencers of Italy
Fencers at the 1952 Summer Olympics
Fencers at the 1956 Summer Olympics
Olympic gold medalists for Italy
Olympic silver medalists for Italy
Olympic bronze medalists for Italy
Sportspeople from Como
Olympic medalists in fencing
Recipients of the Olympic Order
Medalists at the 1952 Summer Olympics
Medalists at the 1956 Summer Olympics
Mayors of Como